Kelly Deshawn McCarty (born August 24, 1975) is a naturalized Russian former professional basketball player, originally from the United States. He represented the senior men's Russian national basketball team internationally. At 2.01 m (6'7") 235 lbs., he played at both the  shooting guard and small forward positions. His primary position was small forward.

High school
Born in Chicago, McCarty played high school basketball at Quitman High School, in Quitman, Mississippi.

College career
McCarty played college basketball at the University of Southern Mississippi, with the Southern Miss Golden Eagles, leading the college team in scoring and rebounding during his senior year, in 1997–98.

Professional career
After playing in just 2 regular season games for the Denver Nuggets of the NBA in 1999, McCarty went on to play in Israel, spending 5 seasons there - at first with Maccabi Raanana. He then signed with the Israeli Premier League club Hapoel Jerusalem, and with them he won the ULEB Cup (now called EuroCup) in the 2003–04 season, being voted the EuroCup Finals MVP. 

The next year, in the 2004–05 season, he moved to the Russian Super League A club Dynamo Saint Petersburg, and without losing a single game in the FIBA Europe League competition, his team won the championship, and he was elected the Final Four MVP of that tournament. He spent the last years of his career playing in Russia.

National team career
McCarty also played for the senior men's Russian national basketball team at EuroBasket 2009.

Club honors
 EuroCup:
Winner (2): 2003–04, 2010–11
Runner-up (1): 2008–09
 FIBA Europe League:
Winner (1): 2004–05
 Russian Championship:
Runner-up (3): 2007–08, 2008–09, 2009–10
Third place (3): 2005–06, 2006–07, 2010–11
 Russian Cup:
Winner (1): 2008
 Israeli Premier League
Runner-up (1): 1999–2000
 Israeli Cup:
Runner-up (1): 2003, 2004

References

External links

NBA.com Profile
Kelly McCarty at Basketball-Reference.com
Euroleague.net Profile
FIBA.com Profile
FIBA Europe Profile
Eurobasket.com Profile
Russian League Profile

1975 births
Living people
American emigrants to Russia
American expatriate basketball people in Israel
American expatriate basketball people in Russia 
American men's basketball players
BC Dynamo Saint Petersburg players
BC Khimki players
BC UNICS players
Denver Nuggets players
Hapoel Jerusalem B.C. players
Israeli Basketball Premier League players
Maccabi Givat Shmuel players
Maccabi Ra'anana players
Maccabi Rishon LeZion basketball players
Naturalised citizens of Russia
People from Quitman, Mississippi
Russian men's basketball players
Russian people of African-American descent
Shooting guards
Small forwards
Southern Miss Golden Eagles basketball players
Undrafted National Basketball Association players
Basketball players from Chicago